The 2015 UCI World Tour was the seventh edition of the ranking system launched by the Union Cycliste Internationale (UCI) in 2009. The series started with the opening stage of the Tour Down Under on 20 January, and concluded with Il Lombardia on 4 October.

For the second successive year, Spain's Alejandro Valverde won the World Tour individual points title, amassing 675 points over the course of the season. In the teams' rankings,  finished top for the third year running, with a total of 1619 points. The nations' rankings was comfortably headed by Spain, with a points advantage of 839 over Italy, who moved into second at the final race  with Vincenzo Nibali's victory at Il Lombardia.



Teams 

The UCI WorldTeams competed in the World Tour, with UCI Professional Continental teams, or national squads, able to enter at the discretion of the organisers of each event.

Events 
All events from the 2014 UCI World Tour are included, except the Tour of Beijing, which will no longer be organised.

Notes

Final standings

Individual 

Riders tied with the same number of points were classified by number of victories, then number of second places, third places, and so on, in World Tour events and stages.

Team 

Team rankings were calculated by adding the ranking points of the top five riders of a team in the table, plus points gained in the World Team Time Trial Championship (WTTT).

Nation 

National rankings were calculated by adding the ranking points of the top five riders registered in a nation in the table. The national rankings, as of 15 August, were also used to determine how many riders a country could have in the World Championships.

Leader progress

References

External links 

 
UCI World Tour
2015 in men's road cycling